The 1964 UC Santa Barbara Gauchos football team represented University of California, Santa Barbara (UCSB) during the 1964 NCAA College Division football season.

UCSB competed as an Independent in 1964. The team was led by second-year head coach "Cactus Jack" Curtice, and played home games at La Playa Stadium in Santa Barbara, California. They finished the season with a record of four wins and seven losses (4–7). For the 1964 season they were outscored by their opponents 152–164.

Schedule

Notes

References

UC Santa Barbara
UC Santa Barbara Gauchos football seasons
UC Santa Barbara Gauchos football